The 1919 Oklahoma Sooners football team represented the University of Oklahoma in the 1919 college football season. In their 15th year under head coach Bennie Owen, the Sooners compiled a 5–2–3 record (2–1 against conference opponents), and outscored their opponents by a combined total of 275 to 63.

No Sooners were recognized as All-Americans.

Four Sooners received All-Southwest Conference honors: Paul Johnston, Hugh McDermott, Sol Swatek, Claude Tyler.

Schedule

References

Oklahoma
Oklahoma Sooners football seasons
Oklahoma Sooners football